Timpul (Romanian for "The Time") is a literary magazine published in Romania. Originally a political newspaper, it was the official platform of the Conservative Party between 1876 and 1914.

The publication is still active (2018) and published as a monthly in Iași, with print and online editions.

References

Newspapers published in Romania
Conservative Party (Romania, 1880–1918)
Mass media in Iași